Kevin McHattie (born 15 July 1993) is a Scottish professional footballer who plays as a left-back for Brechin City.  He has previously played for Heart of Midlothian, Kilmarnock, Raith Rovers, Alloa Athletic, Derry City and Inverness Caledonian Thistle.

McHattie has represented Scotland at under-17 and under-21 level.

Club career
McHattie progressed through the youth ranks at Dunfermline Athletic. He joined Hearts in 2010 aged 17 at under 19 level.

Hearts
He made his first team debut on 13 August 2011 as a substitute against Aberdeen in Hearts 3–0 win at Tynecastle. After one appearance for the first team McHattie was sent on loan to Alloa Athletic to gain first team experience. On 1 September 2015, McHattie left the club, being released from his contract by mutual consent.

Alloa Athletic (loan)
On 7 December 2011 McHattie signed for Scottish Third Division side Alloa Athletic on loan until January 2012. Making his league debut on 10 December against Queen's Park. In all he made five appearances for Alloa before returning to Hearts with his last game coming on 21 January against Stranraer. Alloa requested his deal be extended however Hearts wanted him to return.

Kilmarnock
After his release by Hearts, McHattie signed a three-year contract with Kilmarnock on 1 September 2015. McHattie scored a match-winning goal on his debut for Kilmarnock, against Dundee United on 13 September.

Raith Rovers
On 17 June 2016, it was announced that McHattie had signed a one-year deal with Raith Rovers. At the end of his contract, McHattie was released by the club after struggling with an injury, however, shortly after the start of the 2017–18 season, he signed a new one-year deal which would keep him at Stark's Park until May 2018. He was released by the club following the end of his contract.

Derry City
On 1 August 2018, McHattie was announced as having signed for Irish side Derry City F.C.

Inverness CT 
McHattie joined Inverness Caledonian Thistle in January 2019 and made his debut at the end of a 2–1 home loss to Queen of the South.

On 15 June 2021, Inverness announced that McHattie would leave the club.

Brechin City

On 9 September 2021, McHattie signed for Brechin City of the Highland League, in what was described as a 'major coup' for the club.

International career
He made his debut at under-17 level in a UEFA European Championship qualifier in 2009 against Cyprus. His last match for Scotland was a Challenge cup match against Malta. In all he made four appearances for Scotland.

Career statistics

References

External links
Uefa Profile

Living people
1993 births
People from Glenrothes
Scottish footballers
Association football defenders
Dunfermline Athletic F.C. players
Heart of Midlothian F.C. players
Alloa Athletic F.C. players
Kilmarnock F.C. players
Raith Rovers F.C. players
Scottish Premier League players
Scottish Football League players
Scotland youth international footballers
Footballers from Fife
Scotland under-21 international footballers
Scottish Professional Football League players
Derry City F.C. players
Inverness Caledonian Thistle F.C. players
Brechin City F.C. players